Lilya Horishna (born 28 December 1994) is a Ukrainian freestyle wrestler. She is a member of Spartak Lviv sports club. She is 2019 European championships silver medalist.

In 2015, she competed in the women's freestyle 53 kg event at the 2015 World Wrestling Championships held in Las Vegas, United States.

References

External links
 FILA database

1994 births
Living people
Ukrainian female sport wrestlers
European Wrestling Championships medalists
21st-century Ukrainian women